Casey County Schools is a school district headquartered in Liberty, Kentucky. It serves Casey County.

Schools
 Secondary schools
 Casey County High School
 Casey County Middle School

Primary schools:
 Jones Park Elementary School
 Walnut Hill Elementary School
 Liberty Elementary School

Other:
 Casey County ATC

References

External links
 Casey County Schools
School districts in Kentucky
Education in Casey County, Kentucky